The 1955 Dixie Classic was a mid-season college basketball tournament held December 29–31, 1955 at NC State's Reynolds Coliseum in Raleigh, North Carolina. It was the seventh iteration of the Dixie Classic and it was part of the 1955–56 NCAA men's basketball season.

Second-ranked NC State entered the tournament as a clear favorite as the reigning champions who were so far undefeated in the season. NC State defeated North Carolina 82–20 in the final to win their sixth Dixie title.

Ronnie Shavlik of NC State was named the most valuable player of the tournament for the second year in a row. Across the three days of six double-headers, the total attendance was 71,800.

Teams
Each year, the Dixie Classic included the "Big Four" teams (Duke, NC State, North Carolina, and Wake Forest), as well as four other invited teams. The 1955 teams were:
 Wake Forest Demon Deacons
 Minnesota Golden Gophers
 Oregon State Beavers
 NC State Wolfpack
 Duke Blue Devils
 Wyoming Cowboys
 Villanova Wildcats
 North Carolina Tar Heels

Bracket

Game log

References

External links
 
 1955 Dixie Classic program via NC State Libraries

1955–56 NCAA men's basketball season
1955 in sports in North Carolina
December 1955 sports events in the United States
1955